Shantaram Rajaram Vankudre (18 November 1901 – 30 October 1990), referred to as V. Shantaram or Shantaram Bapu, was an Indian filmmaker, film producer, and actor known for his work in Hindi and Marathi films.  He is most known for films such as Dr. Kotnis Ki Amar Kahani (1946), Amar Bhoopali (1951), Jhanak Jhanak Payal Baaje (1955), Do Aankhen Barah Haath (1957), Navrang (1959), Duniya Na Mane (1937), Pinjara (1972), Chani, Iye Marathiche Nagari and Zunj.

Career
V. Shantaram started his film career doing odd jobs in Maharashtra Film Co. owned by Baburao Painter at Kolhapur. He went on to debut as an actor in the silent film Surekha Haran in 1921.

Shantaram, fondly known as Annasahebআন্নাসাহেব , had an illustrious career as a filmmaker for almost seven decades. He was one of the early filmmakers to realize the efficacy of the film medium as an instrument of social change and used it successfully to advocate humanism on one hand and expose bigotry and injustice on the other. V. Shantaram had a very keen interest in music. It is said that he "ghost wrote" music for many of his music directors, and took a very active part in the creation of music. Some of his songs had to rehearsed several times before they were approved by V. Shantaram.
 He Was Also Praised  By Charlie Chaplin for his Marathi film Manoos. Chaplin reportedly liked the film to a great extent.

He directed his first film Netaji Palkar, in 1927. In 1929, he founded the Prabhat Film Company along with Vishnupant Damle, K.R. Dhaiber, S. Fatelal and S.B. Kulkarni, which made Ayodhyecha Raja, the first Marathi language film in 1932 under his direction. He left Prabhat co. in 1942 to form "Rajkamal Kalamandir" in Mumbai. In time, "Rajkamal" became one of the most sophisticated studios of the country.

Shantaram introduced his daughter Rajshree (his daughter with Jayashree) and Jeetendra in the 1964 film Geet Gaya Patharon Ne. That was the debut film for both of them. He also introduced his second wife Sandhya's niece Ranjana Deshmukh into the Marathi film industry through Chandanachi Choli Ang Ang Jaali, directed by his son Kiran Shantaram in 1975. Ranjana dominated the Marathi silver screen in the 70s and 80s.

The Dadasaheb Phalke Award was conferred on him in 1985. He was posthumously awarded the Padma Vibhushan in 1992.

His autobiography Shantarama was published in Hindi and Marathi.

The V. Shantaram Award was constituted by Central Government and Maharashtra State Government. The V. Shantaram Motion Picture Scientific Research and Cultural Foundation, established in 1993, offers various awards to film-makers. The award is presented annually on 18 November. A postage stamp dedicated to Shantaram was released by India Post on 17 November 2001.

Personal life
Shantaram was born in 1901 at Kolhapur to a Marathi family with a Jain Kasar father and Hindu mother. In 1921, aged 20, he married 12-year-old Vimalabai in a match arranged by their families. He had four children with Vimalabai, Prabhat Kumar (after whom Shantaram named his movie company) and daughters Saroj, Madhura and Charusheela. Saroj, the eldest daughter, is married to Soli Engineer, a Parsi gentleman, and they run the Valley View Grand Resort at Panhala near Kolhapur, built on Shantaram's farmhouse, which was inherited by Saroj. Shantaram's second daughter, Madhura, is the wife of Pandit Jasraj and mother of music director Shaarang Dev Pandit and of TV personality Durga Jasraj. Shantaram's third daughter, Charusheela, is the mother of Hindi and Marathi actor Sushant Ray a.k.a. Siddharth Ray.

In 1941, Shantaram married the actress Jayashree (née Kamulkar), with whom he had worked together in several films, including Shakuntala (1942). He had three children with Jayashree: a  son, the Marathi film director and producer Kiran Shantaram, and two daughters, the actress Rajshree and Tejashree.

In 1956, just before the law was changed to prohibit polygamy for Hindus (but not for Muslims), Shantaram married another of his leading ladies, the actress Sandhya (née Vijaya Deshmukh), who had already starred in his films Amar Bhoopali and Parchaiyan and would go on to star in many of his future films like Do Aankhen Barah Haath, Jhanak Jhanak Payal Baaje, Navrang, Jal Bin Machhli Nritya Bin Bijli and Sehra. They did not have any children together, but Sandhya bonded strongly with Vimalabai and her children, and she lives with them as a respected mother.

Shantaram died on 30 October 1990 in Mumbai. He was survived by his three wives and his seven children.

Vimalabai died in 1996 after being bedridden for four years. Jayashree died peacefully in her sleep in 2003.

Shantaram used to live at Panhala near Kolhapur in Maharashtra state. His daughter Saroj has maintained his house and has converted the rest of the property into a hotel named Valley View Grand.

V. Shantaram worked in railway workshop Hubballi, Karnataka State
V. Shantaram's family moved from Kholapur to Hubbbali also known as Hubli in Karnataka in 1917 facing tough time financially. Shantaram a teenager then joined as a fitter in the railway workshop at Hubballi, for a salary of 8 annas (50 paise) per day, impressed by his hard work his salary was raised to 12 annas per day. 
In the evenings he worked as a door keeper at NEW Deccan Cinema Theatre at Hubballi. Though he was not paid for this job, he was allowed to watch all movies free. There he watched movies of Dadasaheb Phalke, father of Indian Cinema, and developed passion for the movies. He learnt photography and sign board painting in Hubballi. He said later that the first time he touched camera he instantly connected to it.

Filmography

As actor
"Surekha Haran" (1921)
 Sinhagad (1923)
 Savkari Pash (1925)
 Stri (1961)
 Parchhain (1952)
 Do Ankhen Barah Haath (1957)

As producer
 Bhakticha Mala (1944)
 Maali (1944)
 Banwasi (1948)
 Sehra (1963)
 Geet Gaya Patharon Ne (1964)
  Vanvaas  (1967)
 Ladki Sahyadri Ki (1966)
 Jal Bin Machhli Nritya Bin Bijli (1971)
 Raja Rani Ko Chahiye Pasina (1978)
 Jhanjhaar (1987)

As director

Maharashtra Film Company
 Netaji Palkar (1927)

Prabhat Film Company
 Gopal Krishna (1929)
 Udaykal (1930)
 Rani Saheba (1930)
 Khooni Khanjar (1930)
 Chandrasena (1931)
 Maya Machindra (1932)
 Agnikankan (1932)
 Ayodhyecha Raja (1932)
 Sinhagad (1933)
 Sairandhri (1933)
 Amrit Manthan (1934)
 Dharmatma (1935)
 Chandrasena (1935)
 Amar Jyoti (1936)
 Duniya Na Mane (1937)
 Kunku (1937)
 Manoos (1939)
 Aadmi (1939)
 Padosi (1941)

Rajkamal Kalamandir
 Shakuntala (1943)
 Bhagawan Das Patel (1997)
 Dr. Kotnis Ki Amar Kahani (1946)
 Lokshahir Ram Joshi (1947)
 Apna Desh (1949)
 Dahej (1950)
 Amar Bhoopali (1951)
 Teen Batti Char Raasta (1953)
 Surang (1953)
 Subah Ka Tara (1954)
 Jhanak Jhanak Payal Baaje (1955)
 Do Aankhen Barah Haath (1957)
 Navrang (1959)
 Stree (1961)
 Sehra (1963)
 Geet Gaya Patharon Ne (1964)
 Ladki Sahyadri Ki (1966)
 Boond Jo Ban Gayee Moti (1967)
 Jal Bin Machhli Nritya Bin Bijli (1971)
 Pinjra (1973)
 Jhanjhaar (1987)

Source: IMDB

Awards and recognition

Recognition

 2017 – on 18 November 2017, Google honored Shantaram on his 116th Birthday with a Google Doodle on their Indian front page.
 1952 – Amar Bhoopali (The Immortal Song) competed at the 1952 Cannes Film Festival.

Awards 
 1955 – All India Certificate of Merit for Best Feature Film – Jhanak Jhanak Payal Baaje
 1955 – President's Silver Medal for Best Feature Film in Hindi – Jhanak Jhanak Payal Baaje
 1957 – President's Gold Medal for the All India Best Feature Film – Do Aankhen Barah Haath
 1957 – President's Silver Medal for Best Feature Film in Hindi – Do Aankhen Barah Haath
 1957 – Filmfare Award for Best Director – Jhanak Jhanak Payal Baaje
 1958 – Berlin International Film Festival, OCIC Award: Do Aankhen Barah Haath
 1958 – Berlin International Film Festival, Silver Bear (Special Prize): Do Aankhen Barah Haath
 1985 – Dadasaheb Phalke Award
 1992 – Padma Vibhushan (posthumous)

See also
 List of Indian winners and nominees of the Golden Globe Awards

References

Biographies
 Shantaram, Kiran & Narwekar, Sanjit; V Shantaram: The Legacy of the Royal Lotus, 2003, Rupa & Co., .
 Banerjee, Shampa; Profiles, five film-makers from India: V. Shantaram, Raj Kapoor, Mrinal Sen, Guru Dutt, Ritwik Ghatak Directorate of Film Festivals, National Film Development Corp, 1985.

External links

 
 'Well ahead of his times', Article on V.Shantaram in The Hindu dated 30 November 2001

1901 births
1990 deaths
Indian male film actors
Hindi-language film directors
Marathi film directors
Marathi cinema
Film producers from Maharashtra
Indian male screenwriters
People from Kolhapur
Dadasaheb Phalke Award recipients
Golden Globe Award winners
Recipients of the Padma Vibhushan in arts
20th-century Indian male actors
Shantaram family
20th-century Indian film directors
Film directors from Maharashtra
Indian silent film directors
Producers who won the Best Feature Film National Film Award
Directors who won the Best Feature Film National Film Award
20th-century Indian screenwriters